Antaeotricha incisurella is a moth in the family Depressariidae. It was described by Francis Walker in 1864. It is found in Amazonas, Brazil.

Adults are silvery white, the forewings with a blackish point on the base of the costa, and with two blackish streaks extending obliquely outward from the costa. The first streak is connected with the inner end of a brown short interrupted stripe, which occupies the interior border. The second is connected with the outer end of the same stripe, which has a blackish point in front of its interrupted part. The marginal points are black and minute. The hindwings are cinereous (ash gray) brown.

References

Moths described in 1864
incisurella
Moths of South America